Miles railway station is located on the Western line in Queensland, Australia. It serves the town of Miles. The station has one platform, opening in 1878. it is situated 408 kilometres (253 mi) from the Westlander's western terminus, Charleville and 334 kilometres (207 mi) from the Westlander's eastern terminus, Roma Street.

Services
Miles is served by Queensland Rail Travel's twice weekly Westlander service travelling between Brisbane and Charleville. 

 The westbound service (3S86) passes through early on Wednesday and Friday Mornings
 The eastbound service (3987) passes through early on Thursday and Saturday Mornings

Until the end of 1993, Miles was served by a rail motor service that travelled from Roma to Roma Street railway station via Wallumbilla, Yuleba, Miles, Chinchilla, Dalby, Oakey and Toowoomba in conjunction with a railbus (Train-link) service operated by McCafferty's (now known as Greyhound Australia).

References

External links

Miles station Queensland's Railways on the Internet

Darling Downs
Railway stations in Australia opened in 1878
Regional railway stations in Queensland
Western railway line, Queensland